Roberto Amoroso (1911–1994) was an Italian screenwriter and film producer. Amoroso came from Naples and his films were generally either shot or set in the city.

Selected filmography
 Malaspina (1947)
 Madunnella (1948)
 Malavita (1951)
 Melody of Love (1954)
 Donatella (1956)
 The Lightship (1963)
 Gang War (1971)

References

Bibliography
 Moine, Raphaëlle. Cinema Genre. John Wiley & Sons, 2006.

External links

1911 births
1994 deaths
Film people from Naples
Italian film producers
Italian male screenwriters
20th-century Italian screenwriters
20th-century Italian male writers